Mulobezi District is a district of Zambia, located in Western Province. It was separated from Sesheke District in 2013.

References

Districts of Western Province, Zambia